Ephrin type-B receptor 2 is a protein that in humans is encoded by the EPHB2 gene.

Function 

Ephrin receptors and their ligands, the ephrins, mediate numerous developmental processes, particularly in the nervous system. Based on their structures and sequence relationships, ephrins are divided into the ephrin-A (EFNA) class, which are anchored to the membrane by a glycosylphosphatidylinositol linkage, and the ephrin-B (EFNB) class, which are transmembrane proteins. The Eph family of receptors are divided into 2 groups based on the similarity of their extracellular domain sequences and their affinities for binding ephrin-A and ephrin-B ligands. Ephrin receptors make up the largest subgroup of the receptor tyrosine kinase (RTK) family. The protein encoded by this gene is a receptor for ephrin-B family members.

Animal studies 

EphB2 is part of the NMDA signaling pathway and restoring expression rescues cognitive function in an animal model of Alzheimer's disease.

A recessive EphB2 gene is responsible for the  crested-feather mutation in pigeons.

Interactions 

EPH receptor B2 has been shown to interact with:
 Abl gene
 RAS p21 protein activator 1
 Src

References 

Tyrosine kinase receptors